Sarcostigma is a genus of plants of the family Icacinaceae. It is originally from Malaysia. The genus was described by Robert Wight and George Arnott Walker Arnott and published in Edinburgh New Philosophical Journal in the year 1833.

Species 
Sarcostigma surigaoensis Elmer	
Sarcostigma vogelii Miers
Sarcostigma kleinii Wight & Arn.

References 

Icacinaceae
Asterid genera